Joachim-Friedrich Lang was a German general during World War II.

Biography
Born on 14 September 1899 in Montigny-lès-Metz, Alsace-Lorraine, Joachim-Friedrich Lang joined the German Army before World War II. Following the outbreak of World War II, Lang took part in the invasion of France and then served on the Eastern Front. He had by then reached the rank of Oberst. Lang served in the Field in the 481st Grenadier-Regiment. In this regiment, Lang was awarded the German Cross on 14 June 1942. Soon after, Joachim Lang was awarded the Knight's Cross of the Iron Cross on 4 September 1943. Lang was appointed the commander of 95th Infanterie-Division on 30 June 1944. He was promoted to the rank of Generalmajor (Major General) in October 1944, near Königsberg. Then, Lang fought near Pillau, before being killed in action on 16 April 1945.

Awards and decorations
 Knight's Cross of the Iron Cross, 4 September 1943
 German Cross, 14 June 1942

Sources
 (de) Karl Knoblauch :Kampf und Untergang einer Infanterie Division: Die 95. Infanterie Division.
 (de) Dermot Bradley : Die Generale des Heeres 1921-1945 Band 7 Knabe-Luz, Biblio Verlag, Bissendorf, 2004, p. 370-371.

External links
(de)Generale des Heeres 1939-1945
(de) Die Träger des Ritterkreuzes
(en) Commanders of the 95th Infanterie-Division 

1899 births
1945 deaths
People from Montigny-lès-Metz
People from Alsace-Lorraine
Major generals of the German Army (Wehrmacht)
German Army personnel of World War I
German Army personnel killed in World War II
Recipients of the Gold German Cross
Recipients of the Knight's Cross of the Iron Cross
20th-century Freikorps personnel
German Army generals of World War II